Primorske novice is a regional daily newspaper published in Koper, Slovenia.

History and profile
Primorske novice was establied in 1963 as result of the merger of weekly paper Nova Gorica (founded in 1947) with another weekly named Slovenski Jadran (meaning "The Slovene Adriatic" in English; founded in 1950). It started as a weekly newspaper and became a daily in 2004. It became also the first regional daily newspaper in the country.

Primorske novice is published by Primorske novice d.o.o. which is based in Koper and the paper launched its website in 1996. It has no political affiliation.

As of 2009 it was still the only regional daily newspaper in Slovenia. The 2007 circulation of the paper was 23,000 copies. It became 65,000 in 2013.

References

1963 establishments in Slovenia
Newspapers established in 1963
Newspapers published in Slovenia
Slovene-language newspapers
Weekly newspapers
Mass media in Koper